Kavundampalayam  (also spelled as Goundampalayam) is an area located in Coimbatore, Tamil Nadu, India. It is within the Coimbatore Corporation, about 6 km north of the city centre. Goundampalayam is along Mettupalayam road in Coimbatore, one of the arterial roads of the city. As of 2011, the town had a population of 83,908.

Demographics

According to 2011 census, Goundampalayam had a population of 83,908 with a sex-ratio of 981 females for every 1,000 males, much above the national average of 929. A total of 8,689 were under the age of six, constituting 4,461 males and 4,228 females. Scheduled Castes and Scheduled Tribes accounted for 9.1% and 0.28% of the population respectively. The average literacy of the district was 80.57%, compared to the national average of 72.99%. The district had a total of  22155 households. There were a total of 35,701 workers, comprising 332 cultivators, 204 main agricultural labourers, 998 in house hold industries, 31,082 other workers, 3,085 marginal workers, 101 marginal cultivators, 39 marginal agricultural labourers, 144 marginal workers in household industries and 2,801 other marginal workers.

As per the religious census of 2011, Goundampalayam had 87.21% Hindus, 4.16% Muslims, 8.13% Christians, 0.04% Sikhs, 0.04% Buddhists, 0.03% Jains, 0.38% following other religions and 0.01% following no religion or did not indicate any religious preference.

References

External links
Official website

Neighbourhoods in Coimbatore